Neoechinorhynchus is a genus of parasitic worms belonging to the family Neoechinorhynchidae.

The genus has cosmopolitan distribution.

Species:
 Neoechinorhynchus acanthuri Farooqi, 1981 
 Neoechinorhynchus afghanus Moravec & Amin, 1978

References

Neoechinorhynchidae
Acanthocephala genera